Whitby Goth Weekend, abbreviated to WGW or nicknamed Whitby, is a twice-yearly music festival for the gothic subculture, in Whitby, North Yorkshire, England, organised by Jo Hampshire.

Summary
Whitby Goth Weekend is an alternative music festival held in Whitby. The event consists of two nights of live bands, and three days (Friday, Saturday and Sunday) of alternative trade stalls at the Whitby Leisure Centre, and Whitby Brunswick Centre.

The term "Whitby Goth Weekend" is sometimes used as a generic term to describe events during the week in Whitby as a whole, although the name of the event and its associated logo are registered trademarks of Jo Hampshire of Top Mum Promotions.

History

The origins of WGW are in a meeting of around forty of Hampshire's pen-pals in 1994. The first meeting was held in the Elsinore public house in Whitby, which, with the Little Angel, continues to be a meeting point during the weekend. Hampshire said Whitby was chosen for its Dracula connections, although probably more so because the connection had already fostered a sense of acceptance on the part of locals and businesses rather than any inherent romanticism regarding the location.

The festival was held yearly until 1997, when it became twice-yearly in April and October. It has grown into one of the world's most popular goth music events with thousands of attendees from across the UK and beyond. The main event was held in the town's largest venue Whitby Spa Pavilion (known as the Spa) and the Bizarre Bazaar 'Goth Market' is also held there and at Whitby Leisure Centre and the Brunswick Centre. Access to the Spa in the evening required a ticket and live bands played on both Friday and Saturday from 08:00 until about midnight.

The Metropole was often used as an overspill venue for the Spa, with bands due to play the next evening/or playing from the previous evening. In recent years it has been used as a venue for the markets as well as the clubs, Manic Monday and Sexy Sunday. RAW Nightclub and Abbey Wharf are used for official fringe events; other venues including The Resolution, The Rifle Club, and The Metropole are used for unofficial events.

For many years there was an 80's night held at Laughtons, a genuine venue from the 1980s. The night would traditionally end with the song Vagabonds. In 2010 this venue became a Wetherspoons Hotel, but the lineal descendant of the 80's night continues to take place on the Sunday night.

The "weekend" starts during the day on Friday and fringe events are held on Thursday, Sunday and Monday including club nights, markets, and a charity football match between visiting goth team Real Gothic, and local team Stokoemotiv Whitby. During the October/November event there is an independent custom car show, 'Whitby Kustom' in the grounds of West Cliff School. There are also several "meet ups" aimed at goths with a particular interest, e.g. Gothic Lolita.

Newbies who have not attended the event before are referred to as "Whitby Virgins". To help introduce them to the event, there was a WGW Virgins Meet Up on the Friday morning at the Spa until about 2014.

In June 2018 there was a breakdown in the relationship between WGW and SIV Live, who operate the Spa. WGW was therefore unable to book the Spa for bands for October 2018. In July a new promoter was found to put bands on at the Spa in October. Subsequently, WGW announced a different set of 2019 dates to those announced by the Spa and the new promoter, with bands at Abbey Wharf, a large pub in Whitby.

Economy
The event results in business for the town in general, with attendees spending around 10,000 bed-nights in Whitby and the weekend contributing £1.1 million per annum to the local economy.

Sophie Lancaster
The October 2007 festival was dedicated to the memory of the murdered Goth Sophie Lancaster (who had attended three Whitby Goth Weekends) and a collection of more than £3,000 was raised from various events to fund a memorial bench to her in the town.

Halloween

In the mid-2000s the October weekend on or near Halloween began to attract large numbers of non-goths in Halloween, horror, historical, fantasy and sci-fi costume, which has led to an increase in photographers and visitors. The weekend now attracts other alternative subcultures, including Victorian vampires, rockers, punks and members of the steampunk subgenre. Some regulars consider it no longer a purely "Goth" weekend, and it was acknowledged by Hampshire in the 2014 Whitby Goth Weekend Guide that in order to survive the event would have to diversify into other areas that have influenced Goth.

Concerns have grown about disrespect being shown to the graves in St. Mary's Churchyard by photographers using them for photographic purposes which has resulted in a petition to have the area closed during the event. The proposal was supported by Whitby Goth Weekend, saying that "behaviour displayed in the churchyard is disrespectful and offensive". In 2016 The Bram Stoker Film Festival, which also took place in the town, rehashed a proposal to build a film set graveyard which photographers would be charged to use.

Whitby Goth Weekend acts by year
(*) indicates headline act for each night/event

See also
List of gothic festivals
List of industrial music festivals
List of electronic music festivals

References

Bibliography

External links

Whitby Goth Weekend – Main Site
Invite to the 1995 festival posted to the alt.gothic Usenet newsgroup.
Article in The Guardian by Sam Jordison

Whitby
Goth subculture
Goth festivals
Music festivals in North Yorkshire
1994 establishments in England
Electronic music festivals in the United Kingdom
Music festivals established in 1994
Industrial music festivals